Trivia Crack (original Spanish language name: Preguntados) is a trivia-based video game and one of the most successful brands in the Etermax gaming division. Initially introduced as a mobile game in 2013, it includes different active games, such as: Trivia Crack, Trivia Crack 2 and Trivia Crack Adventure, among others, available on Android and iOS. Trivia Crack has more than 600 million downloads worldwide and more than 150 million active users annually, including those who are entertained and connect with others through social networks, such as Facebook or with the free Instagram filter Challenge Trivia Crack, with the action of Google Assistant, the skill of Alexa of Amazon and the Apple Watch version. Trivia Crack is available in more than 180 countries, ranking # 1 in trivia games in 125 of them. Board games, consumer products and experiences, as well as the animated series Triviatopia, inspired by its characters, complete the experience.

The franchise is developed by the company Etermax, whose teams are located in Argentina (where the game was initially developed), Uruguay, Germany, Brazil and Mexico.

Trivia Crack 
The original mobile game allows users to compete against friends and people around the world. Modeled after popular games such as Trivial Pursuit, it became the most downloaded game in December 2014 from the Apple App Store as well as most viewed advertisement on all of mobile phone services worldwide, mostly iOS. The surge in popularity has been attributed to the addition of The Question Factory which allowed users to submit their own questions. The game initially launched on October 26, 2013, specifically to Latin America and was later translated into English.

Trivia Crack 2 
In 2018, Etermax launched Trivia Crack'''s sequel, Trivia Crack 2, that adds more modes than the original version. 

 Trivia Cars 
Etermax decides to launches another game of Trivia Crack named Trivia Cars. The game has the same premise, but the game is a race with the characters in cars like Super Mario Kart.

 Trivia Crack Adventure Trivia Crack Adventure launched in 2021. The game has the same premise, but with elements of a board game, like the Mario Party series.

 Triviatopia 
Launched in September 2019, Triviatopia  is the animated series based on Trivia Crack characters, aimed to children. It is composed of 20 episodes that are 2 minutes each, in which Tito, Hector, Pop, Alison, Bonzo and Tina ask a question and travel in time and space to learn in each of their journeys. The show stars Wayne Knight, Kristen Schaal, Hugh Grant, Sky Katz, Elizabeth Banks and Rob Lowe.

 Trivia Quest Trivia Quest, a daily interactive game show based on Trivia Crack'', premiered on Netflix on April 1, 2022. The premise follows the viewer helping Willy trying to defeat Rocky and rescue his 10 friends, Tina, Bonzo, Andy, Tito, Sweetie, Hector, Pop, Mark, Albert and Paige.

References

2013 video games
Android (operating system) games
Browser games
Facebook games
IOS games
Multiplayer video games
Quiz video games
Video games developed in Argentina
Windows Phone games